The Mysterious Benedict Society is a quartet of children's books by Trenton Lee Stewart chronicling the adventures of four children, initially gathered together by the eccentric Mr. Benedict. The first children's novels written by Stewart, each of the first three books were published annually from 2007 to 2009, with the fourth installment following a decade later. A prequel novel detailing the backstory of Nicholas Benedict was released in 2012.

Series overview

The Mysterious Benedict Society 

Four young children, who are each gifted in different areas, are bound by a common factor: they are either orphans or unwanted by their parents. The children become involved with the strange Nicholas Benedict and his guild of assistants who are trying to stop Benedict's twin, Ledroptha Curtain, from taking over the world via brainwashing. The children team up against the villain and his evil assistants, the Ten Men.

The Mysterious Benedict Society and the Perilous Journey

The Mysterious Benedict Society and the Prisoner's Dilemma

The Mysterious Benedict Society and the Riddle of Ages

The Extraordinary Education of Nicholas Benedict

Characters 

 Reynie Muldoon is the main character of the series; an average-looking but logical boy who is a natural leader of his friend group. The core four texts follow Reynie closely. Reynie is an orphan; Ms. Perumal serves as his teacher and tutor during his time in the orphanage, and later adopts him as her son. Mystic Inscho portrays Reynie in the television series adaptation.
 George Washington is an extraordinarily smart boy with eidetic memory, meaning he can remember everything he sets his eyes on. Because of this, he is called "Sticky". Seth Carr portrays Sticky in the television series adaptation.
 Kate Wetherall is an athletic and adventurous girl who never goes anywhere without her red bucket of tools, which she uses quite often. She is also able to determine any distance of any room. Emmy De Oliveira portrays Kate in the television series adaptation.
 Constance Contraire is a young girl who is incredibly stubborn and can read people's minds and (later) send mental messages to people. Marta Kessler portrays Constance in the television series adaptation.

Television adaptation

Written by Matt Manfredi and Phil Hay, with Tony Hale cast as Mister Benedict and Mister Curtain, the series aired on Disney+ and Disney Channel, with the first of eight episodes premiering June 25, 2021. Additional cast members include Kristen Schaal as Number Two, MaameYaa Boafo as Rhonda Kazembe, Ryan Hurst as Milligan, Gia Sandhu as Ms. Perumal, Mystic Inscho as Reynie Muldoon, Seth Carr as Sticky Washington, Emmy DeOliveira as Kate Wetherall, and Marta Kessler as Constance Contraire. The series creators have suggested any subsequent season would mix elements from multiple novels, rather than adapt each book as its own season.

Reception 
The series has sold over three million copies. Many critics praised the enigmatic plot and puzzles included in the storyline of The Mysterious Benedict Society; journalist Michele Norris, writing for NPR, said, "Almost everything inside this book is an enigma." Additionally, the ethical decisions and moral lessons contained within the book were praised. Kirkus Reviews said that the book was "rich in moral and ethical issues." In a starred review for The Mysterious Benedict Society and the Perilous Jounrey, School Library Journal described the book as "not just a rip-roaring adventure ... but also a warm and satisfying tale about friendship." Kirkus Reviews was less positive, saying that the book "may wear down less patient readers", citing the prose and needless elaborations in several areas. Horn Book Magazine disagreed, saying that "Stewart keeps interest high throughout". They especially praised the "first-rate brainteasers", with School Library Journal also commenting that it had "plenty of clever twists".

For The Mysterious Benedict Society and the Prisoner's Dilemma, Booklist stated "Displaying much of the charm of the first book, this would make a fitting end to the series, but the Society's legion of fans probably wouldn't say no to more." while the School Library Journal wrote "the story lacks the facile agility of its predecessors. On the other hand, the opening gambit is fresh and frightfully funny ... If this is the last Society installment, readers had better, as Reynie says, 'acquire a taste for the bittersweet.'" Kirkus Reviews called the book The Mysterious Benedict Society and the Riddle of Ages "Clever as ever—if slow off the mark—and positively laden with tics, quirks, and puns." The American Booksellers Association named Riddle of Ages one of their ABC Best Books for Young Readers in 2019.

References 

 Series of children's books
 The Mysterious Benedict Society